John Wickström (23 April 1927 – 10 December 1987) was a Swedish speed skater. He competed in two events at the 1952 Winter Olympics.

References

External links
 

1927 births
1987 deaths
Swedish male speed skaters
Olympic speed skaters of Sweden
Speed skaters at the 1952 Winter Olympics
People from Gävle
Sportspeople from Gävleborg County
20th-century Swedish people